Potamobatrachus trispinosus is a species of toadfish endemic to Brazil where it is found in the Araguaia and Tocantins Rivers.

References

Batrachoididae
Monotypic fish genera
Fish of South America
Fish of Brazil
Fish described in 1995